Teppakulam is a locality near the centre of the Indian city of Tiruchirappalli. It consists of a large artificial tank surrounded by bazaars, prominent among which is a flower market. It contains the Thayumanavar Temple and the Sri Naganathar Swamy Temple, the St. Joseph College Church and Holy Cross Church, and Srimathi Indira Gandhi College for Women. The historic Rockfort is situated nearby.  A large monolithic figure of Ganesh, Mukkuruni Vinayaka, was reportedly found during an excavation of the Mariamman Teppakulam tank. The Teppam Floating Festival is held here on boats in January or February and it is a common time and place for marriages.

References

Neighbourhoods and suburbs of Tiruchirappalli
Temple tanks in Tamil Nadu
Buildings and structures in Tiruchirappalli